Bernardo de Iriarte is a 1797 portrait painting by the Spanish artist Francisco Goya. It is on display in the Musée des Beaux-Arts of Strasbourg, France. Its inventory number is 1660.

The sitter, Bernardo de Iriarte, was a patron and friend of the painter; the dedicatory inscription at the lower edge is testament to both men's "mutual esteem and affection". At its unveiling, the painting was hailed for its likeness and its virtuosity, and it has been considered a masterpiece ever since.

The composition of the painting is thought to be inspired by an engraving after Titian's A Man with a Quilted Sleeve (National Gallery, London), then thought to be a portrait of Ariosto. Goya's own 1792  also anticipates on some aspects of Bernardo de Iriarte as far as the attitude and the gaze of the sitter are concerned.

See also
List of works by Francisco Goya

References

External links
Portrait de Don Bernardo Iriarte , presentation on the museum's website

1797 paintings
Portraits by Francisco Goya
Paintings in the collection of the Musée des Beaux-Arts de Strasbourg
18th-century portraits
Oil on canvas paintings